Noticieros Televisa (branded as N+ after the Televisa-Univision merge) is the news division of Grupo Televisa, which produces national and local news for Televisa's TV channels and local stations across Mexico.

It was headed by Leopoldo Gómez, the Vice President of News for Televisa since 1998 to 2021.

History

1998-2016: the launch of Noticieros Televisa 
After Emilio Azcárraga Jean took over as President of Televisa in April 1997, one of his first moves was to rebuild and restructure the news department and give a more contemporary, stand-alone image; Leopoldo Gómez, an executive close to Azcárraga, was named Vice-President of News. The changes became far-ranging, and the biggest casualty would be 24 Horas, Jacobo Zabludovsky's long-running newscast, long regarded as a mouthpiece of the government. As part of the changes, Zabludovsky retired from the anchor desk, whilst remaining on Televisa as an anchor of special reports.

The new executives then began working on its successor programs, all named El Noticiero; which debuted on January 20, 1998. Guillermo Ortega, then anchor of morning newscast Al Despertar, was tapped to succeed Zabludovsky in the main 10 p.m. edition; Jacobo Zabludovsky's son, Abraham Zabludovsky, would stay as anchor of the afternoon edition. Gómez would also name Federico Wilkins as executive producer of the newscasts; Wilkins, a Cuban-born producer, had become criticized for its tabloid, aggressive and lurid approach to news over at rival TV Azteca, which led Hechos to beat 24 Horas for a time. Wilkins changed completely the style of Televisa's newscasts, doing away with the image of government mouthpiece, but taking the same tabloid approach of its main competitor; this style would help Televisa regain the traditional leadership in the ratings, with TV Azteca still offering stiff competition.

Other notable personalities who have hosted Televisa newscasts over the years include Lolita Ayala, Guillermo Ortega, Adela Micha, Carlos Loret de Mola and Víctor Trujillo ("Brozo").

In 2003, the division moved into a new newsroom in a newly-built expansion of Televisa's Chapultepec headquarters, designed and built by Broadcast Design International in Los Angeles. The space centralized all operations of the division, including studios for the newscasts, into a single space.

2016-2022: relaunch 
As part of wide-ranging changes to Televisa's content offerings, on August 22, 2016, all Noticieros Televisa offerings were completely revamped. As part of the changes, Televisa's flagship 10 p.m. newscast began to be anchored by Denise Maerker; additionally, the running time was shortened from 60 to 30 minutes, to allow for a faster and punchier format. Morning newscast Primero Noticias was replaced by three distinct programs: Las Noticias, an early round-up broadcast anchored by Danielle Dithurbide, Despierta, a longer-form, investigative journalism and opinion-focused broadcast anchored by Carlos Loret de Mola, and Al Aire, a lighter news magazine show with Paola Rojas. Lolita Ayala's newscast was replaced by El Noticiero con Karla Iberia Sánchez, whose running time was also reduced to 30 minutes.

Additionally, a completely rebuilt newsroom studio, designed in-house, and an increased reliance on social media and long-form reporting were pursued as part of the new concept; the division would also collaborate with Televisa's premium drama division Televisa Alternative Originals to co-produce historically-themed series, the first of which was An Unknown Enemy, co-produced for Amazon Prime Video. Initially, the new programs received strong criticism from specialized media analysts, and suffered from low ratings from the inception; the fake news controversy surrounding its coverage of the 2017 Mexico City earthquake didn't help matters, causing ratings to dip into record lows and helping TV Azteca and new rival Imagen Televisión to threaten Televisa in the lead; over time, the format would return to a more traditional style, causing ratings to increase and stabilize.

2022-present: N+ 
In 2022, Televisa spun-off their news division to a company called Tritón Comunicaciones, as part of the regulatory measures to approve the merger of TelevisaUnivision and the main company's refocus into the telecommunications industry.

On March 28, Tritón Comunicaciones unveiled its consumer-facing brand, N+, which serves as the over-arching brand for all operations of the division, including Noticieros Televisa. As part of the relaunch, the company announced ramping up the production of digital original content, including the full launch of N+ Media, a streaming news channel offering separate programming aimed at a younger audience, available on the company's website and through ViX. As part of the brand launch, all of Televisa's news programs, including those aired by FOROtv and by Televisa's regional and local stations, adopted a single corporate image, giving a common style across local and national television news.

Programs

National newscasts

Most of Televisa's national newscasts air on its Las Estrellas network, covering key dayparts. Since 2016, Televisa's flagship 10 p.m. newscast, known as 10 En Punto, has been helmed by Denise Maerker. Its other weekday programs include Despierta (Wake Up), hosted by Danielle Dithurbide, and Al Aire with Paola Rojas in the mornings. The afternoon newscast El Noticiero con Karla Iberia Sánchez was moved from Las Estrellas to Nu9ve in 2018; it is that channel's only regular news program. The move left Las Estrellas without an afternoon newscast for the first time in decades.

FOROtv

In 2010, Televisa launched FOROtv, a channel devoted exclusively to news, analysis and documentary programming. FOROtv airs in Mexico City on XHTV-TDT (channel 4) and as a subchannel of 21 additional Televisa transmitters in large cities.

Regional newscasts

Outside of its national news output, Televisa produces local news at each of its Televisa Regional stations; local newscasts, under such titles as El Noticiero, Las Noticias and Notivisa.

References

External links

Televisa
1998 establishments in Mexico
Television news in Mexico